South Pool is a village, parish and former manor in South Devon, England. It is situated 3 1/2 miles south-east of the town of Kingsbridge and  2 1/2 miles north-east of Salcombe. It is administered by the South Hams local authority. Historically it formed part of Coleridge Hundred. It falls within Woodleigh Deanery for ecclesiastical purposes.  
The village is in an area of outstanding natural beauty at the head of South Pool creek.

Population
The population was 412 in 1801 and 296 in 1901.  In 1641/2 96 adult males signed the Protestation returns.

Village
The parish church is dedicated to  St Nicholas and St Cyriac. The public house is called The Millbrook Inn.

Transport
The nearest transport links are at Frogmore (service 3 between Plymouth and Dartmouth), Kingsbridge (service 164 to Totnes, service 606 to Salcolmbe) and Totnes (train services to/from London Paddington/Plymouth/Penzance/Bristol/Birmingham and the north). Kingsbridge is the nearest town and has a wide selection of shops, including two supermarkets (Morrisons and Tesco).

Local places of interest
Local places of interest are Dartmouth, Salcombe harbour and the creeks towards Kingsbridge and South Pool, the coast path between Bolt Tail, Bolt Head, Prawle Point, Start Point. Salcombe is renowned for sailing, racing taking place regularly, plus a summer regatta. There are many pleasant beaches along this section of the coast path. Slapton Lea near Torcross is a nature reserve. The Start Bay Inn at Torcross is well-known for fish and chips. Other pubs in the area are The Globe Inn (Frogmore), Ashburton Arms (West Charleton), The Pigs Nose (East Prawle), The Cricket Inn (Beesands), The Tradesman Arms (Stokenham).

Southpool was rated as among the "20 most beautiful villages in the UK and Ireland" by Condé Nast Traveler in 2020.

Historic estates
The parish contains various historic estates including:

Scoble (anciently Scobbahull), about 1 mile west of the village, anciently the seat of the de Scobbahull (alias Scobhill, Scobhul, Scobbhull, etc.,) family, whose heir was the Speccot family, of Speccot in the parish of Merton, Devon.

Notable people
 Leonard Darr MP. Resident from 1602 until his death in March 1615.

References

Civil parishes in South Hams
Villages in South Hams